John M. L. Drew (born 1966) is a British literary scholar and Professor of English Literature and Head of the English Department at the University of Buckingham.
He is known for his works on the journalistic work of Charles Dickens and his contemporaries.
Drew is the director of the international research project Dickens Journals Online.

Books
Dickens the Journalist, John M. L. Drew, London, Palgrave Macmillan, 2003

References

Living people
Academics of the University of Buckingham
British literary critics
1966 births
Alumni of the University of Oxford